Cambarus hiwasseensis, the Hiwassee crayfish, is a species of crayfish in the family Cambaridae. It is found in North America.

The IUCN conservation status of Cambarus hiwasseensis is "LC", least concern, with no immediate threat to the species' survival. The IUCN status was reviewed in 2010.

Description
Hiwassee Crayfish have an overall light brown color with darker mottling. Each segment of the abdomen is marked with darker scalloped markings, giving the abdomen a slightly striped appearance. The palm has two rows of tubercles along its mesial margin and the areola is wide. The rostrum tapers essentially throughout its length and does not have marginal tubercles. The maximum length of this species is 80 mm (3.1 in).

References

Further reading

 
 
 

Cambaridae
Articles created by Qbugbot
Crustaceans described in 1981
Taxa named by Horton H. Hobbs Jr.